Jim Carey (August 21, 1929 – February 4, 2006) was an American college basketball coach. He was the head coach at the University of Nevada, Reno from 1976 to 1980.

He died of heart failure on February 4, 2006, in Wichita, Kansas at age 76.

References

1929 births
2006 deaths
American men's basketball players
Moberly Greyhounds men's basketball players
Drake Bulldogs men's basketball players
American men's basketball coaches
Arizona State Sun Devils men's basketball coaches
Nevada Wolf Pack men's basketball coaches